Sokol Gymnasium is a historic building located in Cedar Rapids, Iowa, United States. Sokol is a Czech social and gymnastics organization. It had this three-story, brick, Neoclassical structure built in 1908. It was designed by local architect Charles A. Dieman. It was cleared out and Sokol moved to another building in southwest Cedar Rapids. This building was individually listed on the National Register of Historic Places in 2013. In 2015 it was included as a contributing property in the Cedar Rapids Central Business District Commercial Historic District.

References 

Cultural infrastructure completed in 1908
Czech-American culture in Iowa
Buildings and structures in Cedar Rapids, Iowa
Neoclassical architecture in Iowa
National Register of Historic Places in Cedar Rapids, Iowa
Clubhouses on the National Register of Historic Places in Iowa
Sokol in the United States
Individually listed contributing properties to historic districts on the National Register in Iowa